The Bearpaw Formation, also called the Bearpaw Shale, is a geologic formation of Late Cretaceous (Campanian) age. It outcrops in the U.S. state of Montana, as well as the Canadian provinces of Alberta and Saskatchewan, and was named for the Bear Paw Mountains in Montana. It includes a wide range of marine fossils, as well as the remains of a few dinosaurs.  It is known for its fossil ammonites, some of which are mined in Alberta to produce the organic gemstone ammolite.

Lithology and depositional environment

The formation was deposited in the Bearpaw Sea, which was part of the Western Interior Seaway that advanced and then retreated across the region during Campanian time. It is composed primarily of dark grey shales, claystones, silty claystones and siltstones, with subordinate silty sandstones. It also includes bedded and nodular concretions (both calcareous and ironstone concretions) and thin beds of bentonite. As the seaway retreated toward the southwest, the marine sediments of the Bearpaw became covered by the deltaic and coastal plain sediments of the overlying formations.

Relationship to other units
The Bearpaw Formation conformably overlies the Dinosaur Park Formation of the Belly River Group in central Alberta, and the Judith River Formation in the plains to the east and Montana. It is overlain by the Horseshoe Canyon Formation in central Alberta; by the Blood Reserve Formation and the St. Mary River Formation in southern Alberta; by the Eastend Formation in southern Saskatchewan; and by the Fox Hills Formation in Montana. To the east, it merges into the Pierre Shale.

Fauna

The Bearpaw Formation is famous for its well-preserved ammonite fossils. These include Placenticeras meeki, Placenticeras intercalare, Hoploscaphites, and Sphenodiscus, the baculite Baculites compressus and the bivalve Inoceramus, some of which are mined south-central Alberta to produce the organic gemstone ammolite.

Other fossils found in this formation include many types of shellfish, bony fish, sharks, rays, birds, and marine reptiles like mosasaurs such as Prognathodon overtoni and Plioplatecarpus peckensis, plesiosaurs such as Dolichorhynchops herschelensis, Albertonectes and Nakonanectes, and sea turtles. Dinosaur remains have occasionally been discovered, presumably from carcasses that washed out to sea.

Dinosaurs

Plesiosaurs

Mosasaurs

Turtles

References

Geologic formations of Canada
Cretaceous Alberta
Cretaceous Montana
Cretaceous Saskatchewan
Western Canadian Sedimentary Basin
Campanian Stage
Geologic formations of Alberta
Geologic formations of Montana
Upper Cretaceous Series of North America